Anakhanda is a village of Naria Upazila, Shariatpur District in the Division of Dhaka, Bangladesh.

Education
According to the 2011 Bangladesh census, the literacy rate (age 7 and over) in the village was 58.5%.

See also
 Districts of Bangladesh
 Divisions of Bangladesh
 Upazilas of Bangladesh
 Villages of Bangladesh

References

Populated places in Dhaka Division
Villages in Shariatpur District
Naria Upazila